Sanghutar  is a village development committee in Ramechhap District in the Janakpur Zone of north-eastern Nepal. At the time of the 1991 Nepal census it had a population of 2,177 people living in 394 individual households. The VDC has a small market called Sanghutar Bazaar, situated in the bank of the Likhu River and bordering Okhaldhunga District. The bazaar is flat land near to the bridge (Sanghu in Nepali); therefore, its name is Sanghutar. It is a main commercial center of many neighboring villages of Ramechhap and Okhaldhunga District with a higher secondary school called Himaganga.

References

External links
UN map of the municipalities of Ramechhap District

Populated places in Ramechhap District